Emmanuel Egbunu is the Diocesan Bishop of Lokoja; and the Archbishop Emeritus of the  Anglican Province of Lokoja, one of 14 within the Church of Nigeria.

He was the second Bishop of Lokoja, enthroned in 2004.

Egbunu was born on 4 September 1960 in Lokoja.

Notes

1960 births
Living people
Anglican bishops of Lokoja
21st-century Anglican bishops in Nigeria
Anglican archbishops of Lokoja
21st-century Anglican archbishops